Gail Teixeira (born July 19, 1952) is a Guyanese politician. Since August 2020, she has held the office of minister of parliamentary affairs and governance in Guyana.

Education and career 
Teixeira attended the University of Toronto where she studied History and International Relations, receiving her Bachelor Degree in 1974. She later attended York University and obtained a Master of Arts in Political Science.

Teixeira started her political career as the People's Progressive Party Secretary in 1976.  During that period she was the Women's Progressive Organization's personal secretary to President Cheddi Jagan.  Between 1977 and 1992, she was a member of the National Assembly. After a long tenure as MP, she was appointed senior minister of health for the Guyanese government.  Teixeira subsequently served as the Guyana minister of culture, youth and sports.  On August 5, 2020 she was appointed minister of parliamentary affairs and governance by President Irfaan Ali.

References 

1952 births
Living people
Foreign ministers of Guyana
Members of the National Assembly (Guyana)
University of Toronto alumni
York University alumni